Lej Nair (literally "Black Lake") is a lake above Silvaplana in the Engadin valley, Grisons, Switzerland.

A hiking trail leads from Lej Marsch to Lej Nair. Hahnensee (Lej dals Chöds) and Lej Zuppo are located close by.

Lakes of Switzerland
Lakes of Graubünden
Silvaplana